"Biggest Part of Me" is a song by American band Ambrosia, from the album One Eighty. Released as a single in 1980, the song reached number one on the Radio & Records chart and number 3 on both the US Billboard Hot 100 and Adult Contemporary charts. The song was written by band member David Pack. Pack re-recorded the song for his 2005 album, The Secret of Movin' On.

Personnel
 David Pack – lead vocals, guitars
 Joe Puerta – bass guitar, harmony vocals, backing vocals
 David C. Lewis – Fender Rhodes, acoustic piano, Prophet-5
 Christopher North – Hammond Organ
 Royce Jones – percussion, harmony vocals, backing vocals
 Burleigh Drummond – drums, percussion, harmony vocals, backing vocals
 Ernie Watts – saxophone

Track listing
US 7" single
A. "Biggest Part of Me (edit)" – 3:59
B. "Livin' on My Own" – 4:41

Chart performance

Weekly charts

Year-end charts

Certifications

References

1980 songs
1980 singles
Ambrosia (band) songs
Warner Records singles
Songs written by David Pack